Fly Guy may refer to:

Fly Guy (video game), a 2002 flash game created by Trevor van Meter
 Fly Guy, a character in a series of children's books by Tedd Arnold
 Fly Guy, an enemy in the Mario franchise